This is a summary of the electoral history of Sir George Grey, Prime Minister of New Zealand, (1877–1879). He represented six electorates during his political career.

Parliamentary elections
Grey's first electoral contest in 1870 was fought in the United Kingdom parliamentary constituency of Newark. Subsequent electoral contests were all in New Zealand.

1870 by-election

1875 by-election

1876 election

 
 
 

a Grey resigned from the  seat after he was elected in the  electorate. A petition against his election for Thames had been filed on the following day, on the grounds that he had already been elected in Auckland West (see 1875–1876 New Zealand general election). This was unresolved for several months, and Grey telegrammed in June that he chose to represent Auckland West. However when the committee reported on 8 July that his election for Thames was valid but that he had to choose which electorate to represent, he telegrammed that he chose to represent Thames. A by-election (1876 Auckland West by-election)  was held to replace Grey in Auckland West.

1879 election

 
 
 

 
 
 
 
 

The committee decision (decided on the chairman's casting vote after a split three-three committee vote; see 1879 New Zealand general election) was the opposite to the decision on the 1876 petition.

1881 election

1884 election

1887 election

1891 by-election

1893 election

Notes

References

Grey, George